In mathematics, more specifically abstract algebra and commutative algebra, Nakayama's lemma — also known as the Krull–Azumaya theorem — governs the interaction between the Jacobson radical of a ring (typically a commutative ring) and its finitely generated modules.  Informally, the lemma immediately gives a precise sense in which finitely generated modules over a commutative ring behave like vector spaces over a field. It is an important tool in algebraic geometry, because it allows local data on algebraic varieties, in the form of modules over local rings, to be studied pointwise as vector spaces over the residue field of the ring.

In the commutative case, the lemma is a simple consequence of a generalized form of the Cayley–Hamilton theorem, an observation made by Michael Atiyah (1969). The special case of the noncommutative version of the lemma for right ideals appears in Nathan Jacobson (1945), and so the noncommutative Nakayama lemma is sometimes known as the Jacobson–Azumaya theorem. The latter has various applications in the theory of Jacobson radicals.

Statement
Let  be a commutative ring with identity 1. The following is Nakayama's lemma, as stated in :

This is proven below.

The following corollary is also known as Nakayama's lemma, and it is in this form that it most often appears.

More generally, one has that  is a superfluous submodule of  when  is finitely-generated.

Proof: Apply Statement 2 to M/N.

The following result manifests Nakayama's lemma in terms of generators.

Statement 4: If M is a finitely-generated module over R and the images of elements m1,...,mn of M in M / J(R)M generate M / J(R)M as an R-module, then m1,...,mn also generate M as an R-module.
Proof: Apply Statement 3 to N = ΣiRmi.

If one assumes instead that R is complete and M is separated with respect to the I-adic topology for an ideal I in R, this last statement holds with I in place of J(R) and without assuming in advance that M is finitely generated.  Here separatedness means that the I-adic topology satisfies the T1 separation axiom, and is equivalent to

Consequences

Local rings
In the special case of a finitely generated module  over a local ring  with maximal ideal , the quotient  is a vector space over the field .

Geometric interpretation 
In this form, Nakayama's lemma takes on concrete geometrical significance. Local rings arise in geometry as the germs of functions at a point. Finitely generated modules over local rings arise quite often as germs of sections of vector bundles. Working at the level of germs rather than points, the notion of finite-dimensional vector bundle gives way to that of a coherent sheaf. Informally, Nakayama's lemma says that one can still regard a coherent sheaf as coming from a vector bundle in some sense. More precisely, let  be a coherent sheaf of -modules over an arbitrary scheme . That is:
 Any basis of the fiber of a coherent sheaf  at a point comes from a minimal basis of local sections.
Reformulating this geometrically, if  is a locally free -module representing a vector bundle , and if we take a basis of the vector bundle at a point in the scheme , this basis can be lifted to a basis of sections of the vector bundle in some neighborhood of the point.

Going up and going down

The going up theorem is essentially a corollary of Nakayama's lemma.  It asserts:

Then there is a prime ideal  in  such that . Moreover,  can be chosen to contain any prime  of  such that .

Module epimorphisms
Nakayama's lemma makes precise one sense in which finitely generated modules over a commutative ring are like vector spaces over a field. The following consequence of Nakayama's lemma gives another way in which this is true:

Over a local ring, one can say more about module epimorphisms:

If  is an -linear map such that the quotient  is surjective, then  is surjective.

Homological versions
Nakayama's lemma also has several versions in homological algebra.  The above statement about epimorphisms can be used to show:

 Let  be a finitely generated module over a local ring. Then  is projective if and only if it is free.
A geometrical and global counterpart to this is the Serre–Swan theorem, relating projective modules and coherent sheaves.

More generally, one has

Inverse function theorem 
Nakayama's lemma is used to prove a version of the inverse function theorem in algebraic geometry:

 Let  be a projective morphism between quasi-projective varieties. Then  is an isomorphism if and only if it is a bijection and the differential  is injective for all .

Proof
 Let M be an R-module generated by n elements, and φ: M → M an R-linear map.  If there is an ideal I of R such that φ(M) ⊂ IM, then there is a monic polynomial

with pk ∈ Ik, such that

as an endomorphism of M.

This assertion is precisely a generalized version of the Cayley–Hamilton theorem, and the proof proceeds along the same lines.  On the generators xi of M, one has a relation of the form

where aij ∈ I.  Thus

The required result follows by multiplying by the adjugate of the matrix (φδij − aij) and invoking Cramer's rule.  One finds then det(φδij − aij) = 0, so the required polynomial is

To prove Nakayama's lemma from the Cayley–Hamilton theorem, assume that IM = M and take φ to be the identity on M.  Then define a polynomial p(x) as above.  Then

has the required property.

Noncommutative case
A version of the lemma holds for right modules over non-commutative unital rings R.  The resulting theorem is sometimes known as the Jacobson–Azumaya theorem.

Let J(R) be the Jacobson radical of R. If U is a right module over a ring, R, and I is a right ideal in R, then define U·I to be the set of all (finite) sums of elements of the form u·i, where · is simply the action of R on U. Necessarily, U·I is a submodule of U.

If V is a maximal submodule of U, then U/V is simple.  So U·J(R) is necessarily a subset of V, by the definition of J(R) and the fact that U/V is simple. Thus, if U contains at least one (proper) maximal submodule, U·J(R) is a proper submodule of U. However, this need not hold for arbitrary modules U over R, for U need not contain any maximal submodules. Naturally, if U is a Noetherian module, this holds. If R is Noetherian, and U is finitely generated, then U is a Noetherian module over R, and the conclusion is satisfied. Somewhat remarkable is that the weaker assumption, namely that U is finitely generated as an R-module (and no finiteness assumption on R), is sufficient to guarantee the conclusion. This is essentially the statement of Nakayama's lemma.

Precisely, one has:
Nakayama's lemma: Let U be a finitely generated right module over a (unital) ring R.  If U is a non-zero module, then U·J(R) is a proper submodule of U.

Proof
Since  is non-zero, this set  is nonempty. Since  generates ,.

Suppose , to obtain a contradiction.

Therefore, we have

.

Putting  and applying distributivity, we obtain

.

We have

.

Therefore,

.

Graded version

There is also a graded version of Nakayama's lemma. Let R be a ring that is graded by the ordered semigroup of non-negative integers, and let  denote the ideal generated by positively graded elements. Of particular importance is the case that R is a polynomial ring with the standard grading, and M is a finitely generated module.

See also

 Module theory
 Serre–Swan theorem

Notes

References
.
.

.
 
.
.
.
.

Links 

 How to understand Nakayama's Lemma and its Corollaries

Theorems in ring theory
Algebraic geometry
Commutative algebra
Lemmas in algebra